Brian Simo (pronounced "see-mow") (born October 1, 1959) is an American former professional racing driver and businessman. He is a veteran of Trans-Am racing and the owner and founder of the No Fear clothing line. In addition, he competed on the NASCAR circuit as a road course ringer from 1997 to 2012. This included his run in the No. 33 Chevrolet for Richard Childress Racing in the Nextel Cup Series race at Infineon Raceway in 2005, where he finished in 10th place.

Racing career

Sports car racing

NASCAR

Sprint Cup Series
Simo attempted his first NASCAR Cup Series races in 2000 with Donlavey Racing. He raced the No. 90 Ford to a 36th-place finish and failed to qualify the car at Watkins Glen. For the 2001 season, Simo again returned to the same car and team to run the road course races. He earned a 15th place starting spot at Infineon, and finished 42nd after transmission failure. At Watkins Glen, Simo qualified 42nd and ended up finishing the race in 37th after a crash. Simo did not return to the Sprint Cup Series until 2005 when he raced the No. 33 Richard Childress Racing Chevrolet at Infineon. He started the race in 22nd and worked his way up to 10th place to finish the race with his first top ten. In 2006, Simo was selected to run the road course events for Front Row Motorsports. He was unable to qualify their No. 61 Chevrolet at Infineon, however he did qualify the No. 34 Chevrolet for Watkins Glen, his race ended early and finished 41st after being involved in a crash. For 2007, Simo attempted both road courses for Front Row Motorsports in the No. 37 Dodge, however he was unable to qualify. Simo again drove for FRM in 2008 for the road course races, but in the No. 34 Ford/Chevy instead. He finished 43rd at Infineon and failed to qualify for Watkins Glen due to rain. He attempted both road course races for Tommy Baldwin in 2009, but did not qualify for both. He returned at Infineon in 2010 for Tommy Baldwin, but did not qualify. He raced for Whitney Motorsports in 2011. He made the race at Infineon for the number 81, but did not qualify at Watkins Glen in the 46. He attempted Sonoma in 2012 for Inception Motorsports, but was the only car not to qualify.

Nationwide Series
Simo's first start in the Nationwide would come in the No. 03 Chevrolet. He started the race in the 20th position, but had a driveshaft failure after eight laps and ended the race in the 40th position. In 1998, he failed to qualify for the Gumout Long Life Formula 200 his only oval attempt. Simo returned to the series in 2006 with Frank Cicci Racing and raced the #34 Chevrolet at Watkins Glen to a 22nd-place finish. In 2007, he returned to race for Frank Cicci Racing in their No. 34 Chevrolet at Mexico City. Simo started the race in 39th and provided another 22nd-place finish for the team. For the 2008 season, Simo was selected to run the road courses for Front Row Motorsports in their No. 24 Chevrolet instead of the team's normal driver Eric McClure. His first start came at Mexico City and he finished 28th in the race. He competed in the two other road course races on the schedule for FRM, those being Montreal where he finished 30th, and 20th at Watkins Glen.

Motorsports career results

SCCA National Championship Runoffs

NASCAR
(key) (Bold – Pole position awarded by qualifying time. Italics – Pole position earned by points standings or practice time. * – Most laps led.)

Sprint Cup Series

Nationwide Series

Busch North Series

References

External links
 

1959 births
Living people
NASCAR drivers
Racing drivers from California
Sportspeople from Carlsbad, California
Trans-Am Series drivers
American twins
Twin sportspeople
SCCA National Championship Runoffs participants
Richard Childress Racing drivers